NoCGV Eigun is a Norwegian Coast Guard vessel. It is part of the Coast Guard Squadron South, based at Haakonsvern Naval Base near Bergen. It is a former fishing trawler.

Patrol vessels of the Norwegian Coast Guard
Ships built in the Netherlands
1959 ships